Kopřiva (feminine Kopřivová) is a Czech surname meaning "nettle". Notable people with the surname include:

 David Kopřiva (born 1979), Czech rower
 František Kopřiva (1892–unknown), Czech wrestler
 Jaroslav Kopřiva (born 1990), Czech bobsledder
 Karel Blažej Kopřiva (1756–1785), Bohemian organist and composer
 Ladislav Kopřiva (1897–1971), Czech-Czechoslovak communist
 Luděk Kopřiva (1924–2004), Czech actor
 Miroslav Kopřiva (born 1983), Czech ice hockey goaltender
 Ondřej Kopřiva (born 1988), Czech badminton player
 Štěpán Kopřiva (born 1971), Czech writer
 Václav Jan Kopřiva (1708–1789), Bohemian composer
 Vít Kopřiva (born 1997), Czech tennis player

See also
 
 Kopriva (disambiguation)

Czech-language surnames